Äntligen hemma (Home at last) was a Swedish TV show on TV4 about home improvement. It aired for the first time on 22 April 1997. The show includes DIY interior decorating tips for home owners. The host, Martin Timell, is trained as a carpenter and has worked as a host for various TV shows since 1984.

Lulu Carter has been one of the decorators.

Following accusations of Timell's gross misconduct towards co-workers, TV4 removed the program from its schedule in October 2017.

References

External links
Official website(in Swedish)

TV4 (Sweden) original programming
Swedish reality television series
1997 Swedish television series debuts
1997 establishments in Sweden
Home renovation television series
1990s Swedish television series